Inverness South was a provincial electoral district in Nova Scotia, Canada, that elected one member of the Nova Scotia House of Assembly. It was formed in 1981 when the former district of Inverness County was divided into Inverness North and Inverness South. It existed until 1993, when the boundaries were reformed to create the current provincial district of Inverness and the former district of Guysborough–Eastern Shore–Tracadie.

Members of the Legislative Assembly
Inverness South elected the following Members of the Legislative Assembly:

Election results

1981 general election

1984 general election

1988 general election

References

Former provincial electoral districts of Nova Scotia
1981 establishments in Canada
1993 disestablishments in Canada